Abdera triguttata is a species of beetle belonging to the family Melandryidae.

It is native to Europe.

References

Melandryidae